Liezel Huber and María José Martínez Sánchez are the defending champions but chose not to participate together. Huber played with Lisa Raymond as the first seed while Martínez Sánchez played with Shahar Pe'er.
 Liezel Huber and Lisa Raymond won the title, defeating Sania Mirza and Elena Vesnina 6–2, 6–1 in the final.

Seeds

Draw

Draw

References
Main Draw

Dubai Tennis Championships - Doubles
2012 Dubai Tennis Championships